Riot is the name of two different characters appearing in American comic books published by DC Comics.

Publication history
The Frederick von Frankenstein version of Riot first appeared in Superman: The Man of Steel #61 and was created by Louise Simonson.

Fictional character biographies

New Titans Riot
The first Riot appeared in The New Titans #98.

Frederick Von Frankenstein

Frederick Von Frankenstein is the last of a long line of scientists in his family. His father put tremendous pressure on him to succeed in school and in the lab. The sheer volume of work proved too much for one man, so Freddy used his Uncle Hal's Phase Shifter to create duplicate copies of himself, trying to be the best at everything. During this time, he developed a means to allow himself to stick to virtually any surface, but the duplication process activated a metagene that had surfaced in him. He discovered that he can create clones of himself without a cloning machine. His face then resembled a skeleton. Having all the duplicates deprived him of sleep causing him to have insomnia. He was soon driven insane by it and turned to a life of crime under the alias of Riot.

When Riot was committing a series of thefts from bio-tech facilities, he had his first encounter with Superman. Superman discovered that when he attacks Riot, Riot clones himself. Superman corralled all the Riot clones, but the real Riot got away.

Riot later resurfaces and steals photon fuel samples from S.T.A.R. Labs. He manages to evade Superman, but is caught by Morgan Edge as Riot hadn't cloned himself that time. Morgan had Anomaly beat up Riot until the cage was full. Riot was able to accept Morgan Edge's offer to join the Superman Revenge Squad alongside Maxima, Misa, Barrage, and Anomaly.

Despite the team's bickering, they managed to beat Superman to a stand-still.

The Superman Revenge Squad quickly fell apart when all the members realized that Morgan Edge could not fulfill all the promises he made to them. Riot used the chaos to send his duplicates back to the Squad's lair. Morgan had further ensured his loyalty by keeping one copy behind, shackled with a device that prevented the others from integrating him. Riot freed his copy and slipped away, while Superman defeated the others.

Riot then plotted to steal a phase/time integrator that will enable him to stay together and get to sleep. When Superman came across him, he caused chaos and created a legion which crashed the tower that Lex Luthor was holding a party in. Riot's uncle Hal was present and told Lois about Riot's backstory. Superman stopped the S.C.U. from disturbing Riot until after he had reintegrated and fallen asleep. Once asleep, he was taken into custody.

Riot was among the supervillains recruited/brainwashed by Manchester Black to take part in the "Ending Battle". Superman managed to defeat him easily.

Riot appears alongside Roxy Rocket and Doctor Phosphorus as part of an event arranged by Roulette to see which of them could defeat Batman. Batman, Robin, and Batgirl manage to defeat all of the villains, rendering the bet void.

Powers and abilities
Frederick had the ability to clone himself at will or when attacked. He can also reintegrate the clones into him at any time. Riot II can also stick to walls. One of Riot's most significant advantages in a fight is that the force of a blow delivered to one duplicate is dispersed across all of his currently-active duplicates; as a result, while Superman could theoretically knock Riot out if he struck the original Riot with a powerful enough punch at the start of the fight, with a dozen or more duplicates active at once, Superman's blows will fail to cause sufficient damage to render any of the Riot clones unconscious. However, his ability to duplicate when attacked has also been used against him, such as by confining him in a cage and then hitting him so many times that there are far too many clones in the cage for him to be comfortable.

In other media
 The second incarnation of Riot makes a cameo appearance in Superman/Batman: Public Enemies.
 The second incarnation of Riot appears in Superman Returns, voiced by Peter Lurie.

References

External links
 Riot II at DC Wiki
 Riot II at Comic Vine

DC Comics scientists
DC Comics metahumans
DC Comics supervillains
Fictional characters who can duplicate themselves
Comics characters introduced in 1996
Fictional mad scientists
Fictional physicians
Characters created by Louise Simonson